The Battle of Mount Ortigara was fought from 10 to 25 June 1917 between the Italian and Austro-Hungarian armies for possession of Mount Ortigara, in the Asiago Plateau.

Background
The Italians decided to launch an offensive because the Strafexpedition of the previous year had improved the Austro-Hungarian defensive positions, whence the Italian armies of Cadore, Carnia and the Isonzo could be threatened.

The battle was prepared with considerable means (300,000 men with 1,600 artillery guns) concentrated on a short segment of the front just a few kilometers long. However, although the Italians enjoyed a 3-to-1 numeric superiority in both men and guns, as they faced 100,000 Austro-Hungarians with 500 guns, the attack still presented several problems:

 The Austro-Hungarian positions were very strong.
 The arc formed by the opposing lines was such as to favor the Austro-Hungarian artillery.
 The Italian lines were overcrowded, which made it difficult to maneuver.
 The Austro-Hungarians expected the offensive, so there was no surprise.

Battle
The attack began on 10 June and after fierce and bloody fightings the Italian 52nd Alpine Division managed to capture the top of Mount Ortigara.

The Austro-Hungarian command promptly sent many trained reinforcements. On 25 June, the 11 Italian battalions guarding the summit were attacked by Austro-Hungarian shock troops which retook it, the strenuous Italian resistance notwithstanding.

The 52nd Division alone suffered about half the Italian casualties. General Ettore Mambretti, commander of the Sixth Army, was considered responsible for the heavy casualties and removed from command.

A letter from a young soldier, written on the eve of the battle, is part of the museum of the Asiago War Memorial. Adolfo Ferrero wrote this letter to his family shortly before dying in combat, and the letter was later discovered in the personal effects of his page, whose body was exhumed from Mount Ortigara in the 1950s.

Notes

References

External links
 The Battle of Ortigara

Mount Ortigara
Mount Ortigara
Mount Ortigara
Mount Ortigara
Mount Ortigara
1917 in Italy
1917 in Austria-Hungary
June 1917 events